Antiporus is a genus of beetles in the family Dytiscidae, containing the following species:

 Antiporus bakewellii (Clark, 1862)
 Antiporus blakeii (Clark, 1862)
 Antiporus femoralis (Boheman, 1858)
 Antiporus gilbertii (Clark, 1862)
 Antiporus gottwaldi Hendrich, 2001
 Antiporus hollingsworthi Watts, 1997
 Antiporus interrogationis (Clark, 1862)
 Antiporus jenniferae Watts, 1997
 Antiporus mcraeae Watts & Pinder, 2000
 Antiporus pembertoni Watts, 1997
 Antiporus pennifoldae Watts & Pinder, 2000
 Antiporus simplex Watts, 1978
 Antiporus uncifer Sharp, 1882
 Antiporus willyamsi Watts, 1997
 Antiporus wilsoni Watts, 1978

References

Dytiscidae